The brown-billed scythebill (Campylorhamphus pusillus) is a species of bird in the family Furnariidae.

It is found in Colombia, Costa Rica, Ecuador, Panama, Peru, and Venezuela. Its natural habitats are subtropical or tropical moist lowland forests and subtropical or tropical moist montane forests.

References

brown-billed scythebill
Birds of Costa Rica
Birds of Panama
Birds of the Colombian Andes
Birds of the Ecuadorian Andes
brown-billed scythebill
brown-billed scythebill
Taxonomy articles created by Polbot